Herms is a surname and given name. Notable people with the name include:

George Herms (born 1935), American artist
René Herms (1982-2009), German middle-distance runner
Herms Niel (1888-1954), German composer of military songs and marches

See also
Herm (disambiguation)